Dynoides bicolor is a species of isopod in the family Sphaeromatidae.

References

bicolor